Sigismund Schwabe, known with his latin name Sigismundus Suevus (Freistadt, 1526–1596), was a German mathematician and Evangelical theologian. He was also a musician and poet.

Life 
He was born in Freistadt, Silesia. A well known student of Melanchthon, he studied in Reval (Tallinn) around 1550. He was preacher in Lubań, Silesia, and after 1586 priest in Breslau.

His Arithmetica Historica ("Historical Arithmetic", 1593) was conceived to prepare for the Last Judgment by combining Biblical teaching and arithmetical knowledge.

Works

External links

References 

1526 births
1596 deaths
16th-century German mathematicians
Evangelical pastors
16th-century German theologians
16th-century German writers
16th-century German male writers